Yahyaköy, Susurluk is a town in the Susurluk District of Balikesir Province, Turkey.  It is 57 km from the town of Susurluk and near Akhisar.

History
The village was the site of a battle in the Revolt of Ahmet Anzavur.

Population
The village residents are mainly Circassians and Bulgarian immigrants (refugees).
2007 = 350 
2000 = 434 
1997 = 390

Services
The town has a railway station and has a primary school and post office, water, electricity supply and telephone but the roads are not sealed.

The climate is semi-Mediterranean climate. The town is mainly affected by the Sea of Marmara, but being inland, a more continental climate is effective.  So winters cold and snowy.

See also
Yahyaköy, Karayazı, eastern Turkey
Yayaköy, Şarköy in European Turkey.

References

Villages in Susurluk District
Towns in Turkey